USS Gantner (DE-60/APD-42), a  of the United States Navy, was named in honor of Boatswain's Mate Samuel Merritt Gantner (1919-1941), who was killed in action during the Japanese attack on the Hawaiian Islands.

Gantner was launched on 17 April 1943 by the Bethlehem Steel Company, Quincy, Massachusetts, sponsored by Mrs. Samuel M. Gantner, widow of Boatswain's Mate Gantner; commissioned at the Boston Navy Yard on 23 July 1943.

Service history

World War II, 1943–1945
After shakedown out of Bermuda, Gantner escorted SS George Washington from Puerto Rico to New York, arriving there on 1 December 1943.  She departed New York on 26 December 1943 as a part of the escort for a convoy which reached Derry, Northern Ireland on 8 January 1944.  She returned to New York on 24 January and by 8 October had made seven more trans-Atlantic escort voyages from that port to Derry.

Following repairs in the Boston Naval Shipyard and battle practice in Casco Bay, Gantner departed Boston on 3 November 1944 escorting fleet tug  and towing concrete repair dock ARDC-1 to Cristóbal, Canal Zone.  She then proceeded to Miami, Florida, to serve as floating school ship in waters extending to the Bahamas and Guantanamo Bay, Cuba.  She departed Miami on 19 February 1945 for conversion to a Charles Lawrence-class high speed transport in the New York Naval Shipyard.  She was reclassified APD-42 on 23 February 1945.

Gantner departed New York on 14 May 1945 for amphibious warfare landing exercises in the Chesapeake Bay area until 2 June, then proceeded via the Panama Canal and San Diego to Pearl Harbor where she reported for duty with the 5th Amphibious Force, Pacific Fleet, on 28 June.  After training Underwater Demolition Teams in Maalea Bay until 3 August, she embarked UDT-3 at San Diego and sailed for the Far East via Hawaii and the Marshall Islands to Japan, entering Tokyo Bay on 4 September. Her frogmen reconnoitered beaches and reported on suitability of landing Army occupation forces at Shiogama Wan and Ominato Ko, Honshū, Japan.  From 30 September to 7 October 1945, her swimmers made surveys for the Port Director, Otaru, Hokkaidō with the help of United States Army advance parties ashore.

Gantner departed Tokyo Bay on 12 October 1945 to embark a returning Marine contingent at Apra Harbor, Guam, and sailed thence via the Marshalls and Hawaii to San Diego where she disembarked military passengers on 1 November 1945.

1946–1949 
For the next three years she was based at San Diego, largely employed as an amphibious warfare training ship for Marines.  From 26 January to 6 March 1946 she made a cruise from San Diego with the 1st Marine Division Reconnaissance Detachment for cold weather maneuvers that took her to Kodiak, Juneau, Tolstoi Bay and Clarence Strait, Alaska.  Her amphibious schedule on the California coast was again interrupted on 28 October–18 November 1948 by a cruise northward to act as guard ship on weather and air-sea rescue patrol station for Navy patrol planes scouting north to Seattle, and thence back to San Francisco.

Gantner resumed her amphibious training out of San Diego until 19 January 1949 when she sailed for Shanghai, China.  She reached her destination on 14 February and served on station at the Chinese ports of Shanghai, Nanking and Tsingtao.  Departing the last named port on 7 April, she accompanied the escort carrier  to Yokosuka, Japan, then sailed via Guam and Pearl Harbor for the west coast, arriving at San Diego on 4 May 1949.

Decommissioning and sale to the Republic of China
Gantner was decommissioned on 2 August 1949, and was assigned to the San Diego Group, Pacific Reserve Fleet. She was struck from the Navy List on 15 January 1966. On 22 February 1966, Gantner was sold to Nationalist China under the Military Assistance Program.

The ex-Gantner collided on 17 April 1966 with ex-Walter B. Cobb (former APD-106), while both were under tow to Taiwan, resulting in the loss of ex-Walter B. Cobb.  Ex-Gantner was commissioned into the Republic of China Navy in May 1966 as frigate Wen Shan (PF-34).  With a different hull number, 834, Wen Shan was scrapped in 1991.

References

External links 
 

Buckley-class destroyer escorts
Ships built in Quincy, Massachusetts
1943 ships
World War II frigates and destroyer escorts of the United States
Charles Lawrence-class high speed transports
World War II amphibious warfare vessels of the United States
Cold War amphibious warfare vessels of the United States
Charles Lawrence-class high speed transports of the Republic of China Navy